Miles Emmanuel Bridges Sr. (born March 21, 1998) is an American professional basketball player who last played for the Charlotte Hornets of the National Basketball Association (NBA). He played college basketball for the Michigan State Spartans. A native of Flint, Michigan, he competed for Flint Southwestern Academy (freshman season) at the high school level before moving to Huntington Prep School for his sophomore, junior, and senior year. Bridges was selected 12th overall by the Los Angeles Clippers in the 2018 NBA draft, but was traded to the Hornets on draft night.

Early life
Miles was born on March 21, 1998, in Flint, Michigan, to Cynthia and Raymond Bridges. His father Raymond, a two-time basketball state champion at Flint Northern High School, taught him the game at the age of two. According to Miles, his sister Tara Rushing was an important figure in his childhood. Bridges attended middle school at Woodland Park Academy in Grand Blanc, Michigan. At age 12, he practiced at a local YMCA with future high school teammates and coach Keith Gray.

High school career
As a freshman, Bridges played varsity basketball with Flint Southwestern Academy in his hometown of Flint, Michigan. There, he played alongside future George Mason signee Jaire Grayer and future Mississippi Valley commit Jovan Embry. He stood 6 ft 4 in (1.93) at 14 years of age and was a center. Bridges averaged 10 points, 11 rebounds, and three blocks per game, leading his team to the regional semifinals and a 17–6 record. He was soon offered an athletic scholarship by Oakland University. 
In July 2013, Bridges transferred to Huntington Prep School in Huntington, West Virginia. He was encouraged to make the decision by former Flint Powers Catholic all-state guard JaVontae Hawkins, who had transferred to Huntington Prep as well. Hawkins said, "Just getting away from the violence and distractions in Flint will help him grow and mature because he will be focused and away from his family." As a sophomore, he averaged 9.8 points per game, 9.9 rebounds per game, 2.7 steals, and 3.3 assists per game, while leading the Irish to a 29–5 overall record.

In his junior year, Bridges and Huntington Prep played in the 2015 Dick's Sporting Goods High School Nationals Tournament at Christ the King Regional High School in Middle Village, Queens, New York. On April 2, 2015, Huntington Prep defeated Jaylen Brown and #5 ranked Wheeler 73–70 in the quarterfinals.
On April 3, Bridges had 21 points, eight rebounds, and four assists in a losing effort as Huntington Prep lost to #1 ranked Oak Hill Academy 61–51 in the semi-finals. On the season, Bridges averaged 15.7 points per game, 10.6 rebounds per game, 3.5 assist per game, 2.8 blocks, and 2.3 steals per game with a 31–3 record the most in the school's history, where he played alongside senior and future NBA player Thomas Bryant.

In the 2015 summer,  Bridges participated in the NBPA Top 100 Camp at the John Paul Jones Arena in Virginia. As a senior, Bridges averaged 25 points, 10 rebounds, 5.2 assists, and 2.0 steals while leading Huntington Prep to a 25–11 record. In January 2016, Bridges was named a McDonald's All-American and played in the 2016 McDonald's All-American Game, on March 30, 2016 at the United Center in Chicago, IL, where he scored eight points, three rebounds, and two steals in a 114–107 loss to the West team. He also competed in the Jordan Brand Classic All-Star game.

College career

Bridges was a five-star recruit and was ranked as the 10th-best player of his class by Rivals.com, while ESPN ranked him as the No.8 overall recruit in the 2016 high school class. He declined offers from schools such as Kentucky, Kansas, and Oregon. He announced that he would play for Michigan State on October 3, 2015. Head coach Tom Izzo labeled him a "blue-collar superstar" and expected him to easily fit into the team.

In his debut vs. Arizona on November 12, 2016, Bridges scored 21 points and recorded seven rebounds. On November 24, he scored 22 points and grabbed 15 rebounds to help defeat St. John's. On December 1, Tom Izzo announced that Miles Bridges would miss "as least a couple of weeks" due an injured ankle. Bridges returned to action on January 4, 2017 after missing seven games. He scored a career-high 33 points in a January 24 loss to Purdue.

Bridges was named Big Ten Freshman of the week five times. On February 2, 2017, Bridges was named as one of the ten finalists on the Karl Malone Power Forward of the Year watchlist.

He was named Big Ten Freshman of the year and earned second team all-Big Ten honors. He was named to the Sporting News Freshmen All-American Team and USBWA All-District V Team. He was also named unanimous AP Big Ten Newcomer of the Year and AP All-Big Ten Second Team.

He finished the season averaging 16.9 points, 8.3 rebounds, 2.1 assists, and 1.5 blocks per game in 32 minutes per game.

On April 13, Bridges announced his intent to return to Michigan State for his sophomore season, a move prompting many experts to peg the Spartans as the 2018 National Championship favorites, especially with incoming freshman Jaren Jackson Jr. Many also believed Bridges would be the national player of the year as well as being a top 5 pick in the 2018 NBA draft.

Following third-seeded Michigan State's upset loss in the second round of the 2018 NCAA men's basketball tournament, Bridges announced his intention to forgo his final two seasons of collegiate eligibility and declare for the 2018 NBA draft.

Freshman season awards

Preseason awards and watchlists
 Sporting News #2 player in Big Ten
 Sporting News Preseason Big Ten First Team
 Sporting News Preseason All American 2nd Team
 MLive Preseason Big Ten 2nd Team
 Karl Malone Award Watch List Preseason
 Athalon Sports 15 Impact Freshmen in College Basketball for 2016–17
 Naismith Preseason Top 50
 Wendy’s Wooden Award Preseason List
 Bleacher Report Most Under Pressure NCAA Player
 College Sports Madness 2016–2017 Preseason Big Ten All-Conference 4th Team
 College Sports Madness 2016–2017 Preseason Big Ten Freshman of the Year

Regular season awards
 Big Ten Freshman of the Week
 CBS Sports Big Ten Freshman of the Week
 CBS Sports Big Ten Freshman of the Week
 Battle For Atlantis All-Tournament Team
 Big Ten Freshman of the Week
 Wayman Tisdale National Freshman of the Week
 Big Ten Freshman of the Week
 CBS Top 10 Freshmen in the Nation
 Final 10 for Malone Award
 Bleacher Report- 11th best Freshman in the Nation
 Headline of the 5th Best Freshmen Class
 Big Ten Freshman of the Week

End of the year awards
 CBS Big Ten Freshman of the Year
 Big Ten Coaches Freshman of the Year
 All-Big Ten Second Team Media
 All-Big Ten Second Team Coaches
 Big Ten Freshman of the Year Media
 Sporting News Freshman All-American First Team
 Big Ten Network All-Big Ten Second Team
 Big Ten Network Big Ten Freshman of the Year
 Fox Sports National Freshman of the Year Finalist (5th place)
 USBWA All-District Team
 Karl Malone Award Finalist
 AP Big Ten Newcomer of the Year
 AP All-Big Ten Second Team
 2017–2018 First Team All-Big Ten Coaches selection

Team awards
 Most Valuable Player Award (Team Vote)
 Most Valuable Player Award (Media Vote)
 Jumping Johnny Green Chairman of the Boards Award

Professional career

Charlotte Hornets (2018–2022)
On June 21, 2018, Bridges was selected with the twelfth overall pick by the Los Angeles Clippers in the 2018 NBA draft. He was subsequently traded to the Charlotte Hornets in exchange for the pick before him, Shai Gilgeous-Alexander. On July 2, Bridges officially signed a four-year contract with the Hornets worth $16.3 million. Bridges participated in the 2019 Slam Dunk Contest.

Bridges won the Rising Stars Challenge MVP award for Team USA in Chicago on February 14, 2020, and Team USA won against Team World 151–131.

On November 20, 2021, Bridges scored a career-high 35 points, along with 10 rebounds, in a 115–105 loss to the Atlanta Hawks. On April 13, 2022, during the Hornets' 103–132 play-in tournament loss to the Atlanta Hawks, Bridges was ejected and threw his mouthpiece at a 16-year-old Hawks fan. The next day, he was fined $50,000 by the NBA for the incident.

In the 2022–23 offseason, the Hornets extended him a qualifying offer.

Personal life
Miles is married to Mychelle Johnson, and they have two children.

Domestic violence charges
On June 29, 2022, Bridges was arrested in Los Angeles for felony domestic violence and was released on $130,000 bond. He allegedly assaulted Mychelle Johnson in front of their two children. According to Johnson's hospital report which she posted to Instagram, she was an "adult victim of abuse by male partner" which included assault by strangulation, brain concussion, closed fracture of nasal bone, contusion of rib, multiple bruises, and a neck muscle strain. On July 19, Bridges was charged with one felony count of injuring a child's parent and two felony counts of child abuse. The following day, he pled not guilty to all three charges at his arraignment. On November 3, he pled no contest to the felony domestic charge and was sentenced to three years of probation. The other two charges were dismissed.

Career statistics

NBA

Regular season

|-
| style="text-align:left;"| 
| style="text-align;left;"| Charlotte
| 80 || 25 || 21.2 || .464 || .325 || .753 || 4.0 || 1.2 || .7 || .6 || 7.5
|-
| style="text-align:left;"| 
| style="text-align;left;"| Charlotte
| 65 || 64 || 30.7 || .424 || .330 || .809 || 5.6 || 1.8 || .6 || .7 || 13.0
|-
| style="text-align:left;"| 
| style="text-align;left;"| Charlotte
| 66 || 19 || 29.3 || .503 || .400 || .867 || 6.0 || 2.2 || .7 || .8 || 12.7 
|-
| style="text-align:left;"| 
| style="text-align;left;"| Charlotte
| 80 || 80 || 35.5 || .491 || .331 || .802 || 7.0 || 3.8 || .9 || .8 || 20.2 
|- class="sortbottom"
| style="text-align:center;" colspan="2"| Career
| 291 || 188 || 29.1 || .473 || .346 || .809 || 5.6 || 2.3 || .7 || .7 || 13.4

College

|-
| style="text-align:left;"| 2016–17
| style="text-align:left;"| Michigan State
| || 27 || 32.0 || .486 || .389 || .685 || 8.3 || 2.1 || .7 || 1.5 || 16.9
|-
| style="text-align:left;"| 2017–18
| style="text-align:left;"| Michigan State
| 34 || 33 || 31.4 || .457 || .364 || .853 || 7.0 || 2.7 || .6 || .8 || 17.1
|- class="sortbottom"
| style="text-align:center;" colspan="2"| Career
| 62 || 60 || 31.6 || .470 || .375 || .776 || 7.6 || 2.4 || .6 || 1.1 || 17.0

References

External links

Michigan State Spartans bio
USA Basketball bio

1998 births
Living people
African-American basketball players
All-American college men's basketball players
American men's basketball players
Basketball players from Flint, Michigan
Charlotte Hornets players
Los Angeles Clippers draft picks
McDonald's High School All-Americans
Michigan State Spartans men's basketball players
Small forwards
21st-century African-American sportspeople